The year 1913 was marked, in science fiction, by the following events.

Births and deaths

Births 
 July 11 : Cordwainer Smith, American writer (died 1966)
 December 18 : Alfred Bester, American writer (died 1987)

Deaths

Events

Awards 
The main science-fiction Awards known at the present time did not exist at this time.

Literary releases

Novels 
 Der Tunnel, novel by Bernhard Kellermann.
 The Poison Belt, novel by Arthur Conan Doyle.

Stories collections

Short stories

Comics

Audiovisual outputs

Movies

See also 
 1913 in science
 1912 in science fiction
 1914 in science fiction

References

science-fiction
Science fiction by year